The Log pod Mangartom Mosque was a Sunni mosque that stood from 1916 until the 1920s near the village of Log pod Mangartom in the Austrian Littoral, Austria-Hungary, in the area of what is now the  Municipality of Bovec in northwestern  Slovenia. It was the first mosque to be purpose-built until 2013 in Slovenian territory, although one converted out of a pre-existing building has functioned in the town of Jesenice since 1989.

History
The mosque was built by Bosnian Muslim members of the Austro-Hungarian army serving on the Isonzo Front of World War I. For their religious needs, the military authorities permitted them to erect a small mosque in November 1916 at the foot of the eastern Alps. The building was mostly built of cut stone, with a carved wooden porch, a domed roof, and a square minaret, and it was surrounded by a stone wall and gated iron fence. An area near the mosque was designated the Log pod Mangartom Military Cemetery, where fallen Austro-Hungarian soldiers of all faiths were buried.

At the end of World War I, the Bosnian Muslim troops returned home and left the mosque untended. Italy, which subsequently annexed the area, demolished the deteriorating mosque some years later. The only surviving record of its existence are six photos preserved by local citizens.

See also
 Islam in Slovenia

References 

Bosniaks of Slovenia
Former religious buildings and structures in Slovenia
Mosques completed in 1916
Mosques in Slovenia
Municipality of Bovec
Sunni Islam in Europe
Sunni mosques